Elongation factor 1-alpha 2 is a protein that in humans is encoded by the EEF1A2 gene.

Function 

This gene encodes an isoform of the alpha subunit of the elongation factor-1 complex, which is responsible for the enzymatic delivery of aminoacyl tRNAs to the ribosome. This isoform (alpha 2) is expressed in brain, heart and skeletal muscle, and the other isoform (alpha 1) is expressed in brain, placenta, lung, liver, kidney, and pancreas.

Clinical significance 

This gene may be critical in the development of ovarian cancer.

Regulation 

EEF1A2 is a direct target of miRNA-663 and miRNA-744.

References

Further reading

External links